Stephan Welk (born 23 December 1967 in Korbach) is a German business economist and diplomat. He has been in the Diplomatic Service of African countries such as São Tomé and Príncipe since 2015 and Central African Republic since 7 February 2018.

Early life and education 
Welk was born in Korbach, West Germany. After graduating from high school, he studied business and economy in Germany and England. He went on to complete his Doctorate in Economics on the topic "Possibilities of overcoming bottlenecks and rehabilitation in the crisis management of medium - sized enterprises".

Career 

By 2003, he worked for financing and reconstructing small and middle size companies and was an advisor for the Government of Tehran / Iran and the Gaddafi family. During his time as CEO of Pro Consult AG, he prepared the acquisition of Weserbank AG in Frankfurt for the SAT & Co AG Group in Kazakhstan. Later, he became a member of the management board of the oil and energy group of SAT & Co AG Kazakhstan.

From 2007 onwards, he was focused in consultancy of governments such as Sao Tomé e Principe, Mali, Burundi, Lebanon and Dubai followed in the area of finance and consultations in the diplomatic service. In 2015, Welk was appointed as a Special Advisor of the Ministry of Foreign Affairs in the Diplomatic Service of São Tomé and Príncipe. He works in the Ministry of Foreign Affairs first under the Minister H.E. Manuel Salvador dos Ramos (Minister of Foreign Affairs) and now of the current Foreign Minister, H.E. Urbino Botelho (Minister of Foreign Affairs) in the Diplomatic Service. He is the head of the office in Europe.

On 7 February 2018 Welk was appointed Ambassador-at-Large of the Central African Republic. He also acts as a Special Advisor to the President of the Republic and as a Head of Economic Mission of the Republic.

Press 
The Press described Welk as a lobbyist in the diplomatic service. He linked China and Japan investors to the governments, as well as internationals networkers such as David Arkless to Africa. There is a close link between Welk and the world market price for cocoa. Several TV stations produced documentaries on Welk, his diplomatic activities and São Tomé e Príncipe, such as the ORF.

Honorary appointments 
In São Tomé e Príncipe, he supports the Universidade de São Tomé e Príncipe and allows students, in collaboration with the foreign language department of the university, to visit the University of Münster for 4 weeks a year. In October 2017, Welk was awarded a Grand Cross of the Royal Order of the Lion of Rwanda by Emmanuel Bushayija, holder of the custom title King Yuhi VI of Rwanda. Since Rwanda is a republic and there is no official position as King of Rwanda, this award is of no diplomatic or political relevance.

References

1967 births
Living people
German economists
German diplomats